Cubanothyris is an extinct genus of prehistoric brachiopods in the extinct family Angustothyrididae. Species are from the Triassic of China, the Russian Federation and Tajikistan. The type species, C. elegans, is found only at River Kuna (Triassic of Russian Federation).

See also 
 List of brachiopod genera

References

External links 

 
 
 Cubanothyris at biolib.cz

Prehistoric brachiopod genera
Terebratulida